FC Dynamo Kyiv is a Ukrainian professional association football club based in the neighborhood of Pechersk, Kyiv (Caves [Monastery]). The club was formed in Kyiv in 1927 as part of network of the Soviet Dynamo proletarian sports society. It was formed in place of the already existing local team of Sovtorgsluzhashchie (Russian word for Soviet retail associates).

List of seasons

Ukrainian SSR

{|class="wikitable"
|- style="background:#efefef;"
! Season
! Division (Name)
! Pos./Teams
! Pl.
! W
! D
! L
! GS
! GA
! P
!Dynamomania
!Domestic Cup
!Notes
|-
| style="text-align:center;"|1929
| style="text-align:center;"|
| style="text-align:center;"|
|align=center|
|align=center|
|align=center|
|align=center|
|align=center|
|align=center|
|align=center|
| style="text-align:center; background:silver"|Finalist
|align=center|
|align=center|
|-
| style="text-align:center;"|1931
| style="text-align:center;"|
| style="text-align:center;"|
|align=center|	
|align=center|
|align=center|
|align=center|
|align=center|
|align=center|
|align=center|
| style="text-align:center; background:gold"|Winner
|align=center|
|align=center|
|-
| style="text-align:center;"|1932
| style="text-align:center;"|
| style="text-align:center;"|
|align=center|	
|align=center|
|align=center|
|align=center|
|align=center|
|align=center|
|align=center|
| style="text-align:center; background:silver"|Finalist
|align=center|
|align=center|
|-
| style="text-align:center;"|1933
| style="text-align:center;"|
| style="text-align:center;"|
|align=center|	
|align=center|
|align=center|
|align=center|
|align=center|
|align=center|
|align=center|
| style="text-align:center; background:gold"|Winner
|align=center|
|align=center|
|-
| style="text-align:center;"|1934
| style="text-align:center;"|
| style="text-align:center;"|
|align=center|	
|align=center|
|align=center|
|align=center|
|align=center|
|align=center|
|align=center|
| style="text-align:center; background:silver"|Finalist
|align=center|
|align=center|
|-
| style="text-align:center;"|1935
| style="text-align:center;"|
| style="text-align:center;"|
|align=center|	
|align=center|
|align=center|
|align=center|
|align=center|
|align=center|
|align=center|
| style="text-align:center; background:gold"|Winner
|align=center|
|align=center|
|-
|}

Soviet Union

{|class="wikitable"
|- style="background:#efefef;"
! Season
! Division (Name)
! Pos./Teams
! Pl.
! W
! D
! L
! GS
! GA
! P
!Cup of UkrSSR
!Soviet Cup
!Notes
|-
| style="text-align:center;" rowspan="2"|1936
| style="text-align:center;" rowspan="7"|1st(Group A)
|  style="text-align:center; background:silver;"|2/(7)	
|align=center|6
|align=center|4
|align=center|0
|align=center|2
|align=center|18
|align=center|11
|align=center|14
| rowspan="2" style="text-align:center; background:gold"|Winner
|align=center rowspan=2|1/32 finals
|align=center|spring season
|-
|align=center|6/(8)	
|align=center|7
|align=center|1
|align=center|3
|align=center|3
|align=center|16
|align=center|19
|align=center|12
|align=center|fall season
|-
|align=center|1937		
|  style="text-align:center; background:#a67d3d;"|3/(9)	
|align=center|16
|align=center|7
|align=center|6
|align=center|3
|align=center|33
|align=center|24
|align=center|36
|  style="text-align:center; background:gold"|Winner
|align=center|Quarter finals
|align=center|
|-
|align=center|1938		
|align=center|4/(26)	
|align=center|25
|align=center|15
|align=center|6
|align=center|4
|align=center|76
|align=center|35
|align=center|36
|  style="text-align:center; background:gold"|Winner
|align=center|1/16 finals
|align=center|Point system change
|-
|align=center|1939		
|align=center|8/(14)	
|align=center|26
|align=center|9
|align=center|8
|align=center|9
|align=center|39
|align=center|44
|align=center|26
|align=center|Not played
|align=center|1/16 finals
|align=center|
|-
|align=center|1940		
|align=center|8/(13) 	
|align=center|24
|align=center|6
|align=center|9
|align=center|9
|align=center|32
|align=center|49
|align=center|21	
|align=center|Not played
|align=center|Not played
|align=center|
|-
|align=center|1941
|  style="text-align:center; background:gray;"|8/(15)	
|  style="text-align:center; background:gray;"|9
|  style="text-align:center; background:gray;"|4
|  style="text-align:center; background:gray;"|2
|  style="text-align:center; background:gray;"|3
|  style="text-align:center; background:gray;"|16
|  style="text-align:center; background:gray;"|14
|  style="text-align:center; background:gray;"|10
|  style="text-align:center; background:gray;"|Not played
|  style="text-align:center; background:gray;"|Not played
|  style="text-align:center; background:gray;"|Unofficial (did not finish due to World War II)
|-
| style="text-align:center;" colspan="14"|No championship in 1942–1944
|-
|align=center|1944
| style="text-align:center;" colspan="9"|No championship
|  style="text-align:center; background:gold"|Winner
|align=center|1/8 finals
|align=center|Cup tournaments took place
|-
|align=center|1945 		
| style="text-align:center;" rowspan="5"|1st(First Group)	
|align=center|11/(12)	
|align=center|22
|align=center|1
|align=center|6
|align=center|15
|align=center|13
|align=center|50
|align=center|8
|  style="text-align:center; background:silver"|Finalist
|align=center|1/16 finals
|align=center|
|-
|align=center|1946 		
|align=center|12/(12)	
|align=center|22
|align=center|4
|align=center|5
|align=center|13
|align=center|18
|align=center|39
|align=center|13	
|  style="text-align:center; background:gold"|Winner
|  style="text-align:center; background:#deb678;"|Semi-finals
|align=center|
|-
|align=center|1947 		
|align=center|4/(13)	
|align=center|24
|align=center|9
|align=center|9
|align=center|6
|align=center|27
|align=center|31
|align=center|27
|  style="text-align:center; background:gold"|Winner
|align=center|Quarter finals
|align=center|
|-
|align=center|1948 		
|align=center|10/(14)	
|align=center|26
|align=center|7
|align=center|6
|align=center|13
|align=center|32
|align=center|50
|align=center|20
|  style="text-align:center; background:gold"|Winner
|align=center|Quarter finals
|align=center|
|-
|align=center|1949 		
|align=center|7/(18)	
|align=center|34
|align=center|17
|align=center|6
|align=center|11
|align=center|48
|align=center|47
|align=center|40
|align=center|Not played
|align=center|1/8 finals
|align=center|
|}

{|class="wikitable"
|- style="background:#efefef;"
! Season
! Division (Name)
! Pos./Teams
! Pl.
! W
! D
! L
! GS
! GA
! P
!Soviet Cup
!colspan=2|Europe
!Notes
|-
|align=center|1950 		
| style="text-align:center;" rowspan="25"|1st(Class A)
|align=center|13/(19)	
|align=center|36
|align=center|10
|align=center|11
|align=center|15
|align=center|39
|align=center|53
|align=center|31
|align=center|
|align=center|
|align=center|
|align=center|
|-
|align=center|1951 		
|align=center|8/(15)	
|align=center|28
|align=center|9
|align=center|9
|align=center|10
|align=center|43
|align=center|39
|align=center|27
|align=center|
|align=center|
|align=center|
|align=center|
|-
|align=center|1952 		
|  style="text-align:center; background:silver;"|2/(14)	
|align=center|13
|align=center|7
|align=center|3
|align=center|3
|align=center|26
|align=center|14
|align=center|17
|align=center|
|align=center|
|align=center|
|align=center|
|-
|align=center|1953 		
|align=center|8/(11)	
|align=center|20
|align=center|6
|align=center|5
|align=center|9
|align=center|21
|align=center|26
|align=center|17
|align=center|
|align=center|
|align=center|
|align=center|
|-
|align=center|1954 		
|align=center|5/(13)	
|align=center|24
|align=center|8
|align=center|10
|align=center|6
|align=center|31
|align=center|29
|align=center|26	
|  style="text-align:center; background:gold;"|Winner
|align=center|
|align=center|
|align=center|
|-
|align=center|1955 		
|align=center|6/(12)	
|align=center|22
|align=center|8
|align=center|6
|align=center|8
|align=center|31
|align=center|37
|align=center|22
|align=center|
|align=center|
|align=center|
|align=center|
|-
|align=center|1956 		
|align=center|4/(12)	
|align=center|22
|align=center|7
|align=center|10
|align=center|5
|align=center|32
|align=center|31
|align=center|24
|align=center|Not played
|align=center|
|align=center|
|align=center|
|-
|align=center|1957 		
|align=center|6/(12)	
|align=center|22
|align=center|8
|align=center|7
|align=center|7
|align=center|30
|align=center|30
|align=center|23
|align=center|
|align=center|
|align=center|
|align=center|
|-
|align=center|1958 		
|align=center|6/(12)	
|align=center|22
|align=center|7
|align=center|9
|align=center|6
|align=center|40
|align=center|33
|align=center|23
|align=center|
|align=center|
|align=center|
|align=center|
|-
|align=center|1959 		
|align=center|7/(12)	
|align=center|22
|align=center|6
|align=center|8
|align=center|8
|align=center|26
|align=center|33
|align=center|20
|align=center|Not played
|align=center|
|align=center|
|align=center|
|-
| style="text-align:center;" rowspan="2"|1960	
|  style="text-align:center; background:gray;"|1/(11)
|  style="text-align:center; background:gray;"|20
|  style="text-align:center; background:gray;"|13
|  style="text-align:center; background:gray;"|2
|  style="text-align:center; background:gray;"|5
|  style="text-align:center; background:gray;"|46
|  style="text-align:center; background:gray;"|23
|  style="text-align:center; background:gray;"|28
|  style="text-align:center; background:gray;"|
|  style="text-align:center; background:gray;"|
|  style="text-align:center; background:gray;"|
|  style="text-align:center; background:gray;"|Qualifying round
|-
|  style="text-align:center; background:silver;"|2/(6)	
|align=center|10
|align=center|5
|align=center|1
|align=center|4
|align=center|19
|align=center|14
|align=center|11
|align=center|
|align=center|
|align=center|
|align=center|Final group
|-
| style="text-align:center;" rowspan="2"|1961	
|  style="text-align:center; background:gray;"|2/(11)
|  style="text-align:center; background:gray;"|20
|  style="text-align:center; background:gray;"|12
|  style="text-align:center; background:gray;"|5
|  style="text-align:center; background:gray;"|3
|  style="text-align:center; background:gray;"|41
|  style="text-align:center; background:gray;"|19
|  style="text-align:center; background:gray;"|29
|  style="text-align:center; background:gray;"|
|  style="text-align:center; background:gray;"|
|  style="text-align:center; background:gray;"|
|  style="text-align:center; background:gray;"|Qualifying round
|-
|  style="text-align:center; background:gold;"|1/(10)	
|align=center|30
|align=center|18
|align=center|9
|align=center|3
|align=center|58
|align=center|28
|align=center|45	
|align=center|
|align=center|
|align=center|
|align=center|Final group
|-
| style="text-align:center;" rowspan="2"|1962	
|  style="text-align:center; background:gray;"|1/(11)	
|  style="text-align:center; background:gray;"|20
|  style="text-align:center; background:gray;"|14
|  style="text-align:center; background:gray;"|5
|  style="text-align:center; background:gray;"|1
|  style="text-align:center; background:gray;"|44
|  style="text-align:center; background:gray;"|20
|  style="text-align:center; background:gray;"|33
|  style="text-align:center; background:gray;"|
|  style="text-align:center; background:gray;"|
|  style="text-align:center; background:gray;"|
|  style="text-align:center; background:gray;"|Qualifying round
|-
|align=center|5/(12)	
|align=center|22
|align=center|8
|align=center|9
|align=center|5
|align=center|36
|align=center|28
|align=center|25
|align=center|
|align=center|
|align=center|
|align=center|Final group
|-
|align=center|1963		
|align=center|9/(20)
|align=center|38
|align=center|16
|align=center|12
|align=center|10
|align=center|68
|align=center|48
|align=center|44
|align=center|
|align=center|
|align=center|
|align=center|
|-
|align=center|1964 		
|align=center|6/(17)
|align=center|32
|align=center|10
|align=center|16
|align=center|6
|align=center|42
|align=center|29
|align=center|36	
|  style="text-align:center; background:gold;"|Winner
|align=center|
|align=center|
|align=center|
|-
|align=center|1965 		
|  style="text-align:center; background:silver;"|2/(17)
|align=center|32
|align=center|22
|align=center|6
|align=center|4
|align=center|58
|align=center|22
|align=center|50
|align=center|
|align=center|
|align=center|
|align=center|			
|-
|align=center|1966 		
|  style="text-align:center; background:gold;"|1/(19)
|align=center|36
|align=center|23
|align=center|10
|align=center|3
|align=center|66
|align=center|17
|align=center|56	
|  style="text-align:center; background:gold;"|Winner
|align=center|CWC
|align=center|1/4 finals
|align=center|
|-
|align=center|1967 		
|  style="text-align:center; background:gold;"|1/(19)
|align=center|36
|align=center|21
|align=center|12
|align=center|3
|align=center|51
|align=center|11
|align=center|54
|align=center|
|align=center|
|align=center|
|align=center|	
|-
|align=center|1968 		
|  style="text-align:center; background:gold;"|1/(20)
|align=center|38
|align=center|21
|align=center|15
|align=center|3
|align=center|58
|align=center|25
|align=center|57
|align=center|
|align=center|ECC
|align=center|Second round
|align=center|
|-
| style="text-align:center;" rowspan="2"|1969	
|  style="text-align:center; background:gray;"|1/(10)
|  style="text-align:center; background:gray;"|18
|  style="text-align:center; background:gray;"|10
|  style="text-align:center; background:gray;"|8
|  style="text-align:center; background:gray;"|0
|  style="text-align:center; background:gray;"|25
|  style="text-align:center; background:gray;"|6
|  style="text-align:center; background:gray;"|28
|  style="text-align:center;" rowspan=2|1/4 finals
|  style="text-align:center;" rowspan=2|ECC
|  style="text-align:center;" rowspan=2|withdrew
|  style="text-align:center; background:gray;"|Qualifying round
|-
|  style="text-align:center; background:silver;"|2/(14)
|align=center|26
|align=center|16
|align=center|7
|align=center|3
|align=center|37
|align=center|13
|align=center|39
|align=center|Final round
|-
|align=center|1970 		
|align=center|7/(17)
|align=center|32
|align=center|14
|align=center|5
|align=center|13
|align=center|36
|align=center|32
|align=center|33	
|  style="text-align:center; background:#deb678;"|Semi-finals
|align=center|ECC
|align=center|Second round
|align=center|
|-
|align=center|1971 		
| style="text-align:center;" rowspan="22"|1st(Top League)
|  style="text-align:center; background:gold;"|1/(16)	
|align=center|30
|align=center|17
|align=center|10
|align=center|3
|align=center|41
|align=center|17
|align=center|44
|align=center|1/8 finals
|align=center|
|align=center|
|align=center|
|-
|align=center|1972 		
|  style="text-align:center; background:silver;"|2/(16)	
|align=center|30
|align=center|12
|align=center|11
|align=center|7
|align=center|52
|align=center|38
|align=center|35	
|align=center|1/8 finals
|align=center|
|align=center|
|align=center|
|-
|align=center|1973 		
|  style="text-align:center; background:silver;"|2/(16)	
|align=center|30
|align=center|16
|align=center|8
|align=center|6
|align=center|44
|align=center|23
|align=center|36	
|  style="text-align:center; background:silver;"|Runner-up
|align=center|ECC
|align=center|1/4 finals
|align=center|Draw games rule
|-
|align=center|1974 		
|  style="text-align:center; background:gold;"|1/(16)	
|align=center|30
|align=center|14
|align=center|12
|align=center|4
|align=center|49
|align=center|24
|align=center|40	
|  style="text-align:center; background:gold;"|Winner
|align=center|UC
|align=center|Third round
|align=center|
|-
|align=center|1975 		
|  style="text-align:center; background:gold;"|1/(16)	
|align=center|30
|align=center|17
|align=center|9
|align=center|4
|align=center|53
|align=center|30
|align=center|43
|align=center|1/4 finals
|align=center|CWC
|  style="text-align:center; background:gold;"|Winner
|  style="text-align:center; background:gold;"|Winner of UEFA Super Cup
|-
| style="text-align:center;" rowspan="2"|1976	
|align=center|8/(16)	
|align=center|15
|align=center|5
|align=center|5
|align=center|5
|align=center|14
|align=center|12
|align=center|15
|align=center rowspan=2|1/4 finals
|align=center rowspan=2|ECC
|align=center rowspan=2|1/4 finals
|align=center|spring half
|-
|  style="text-align:center; background:silver;"|2/(16)	
|align=center|15
|align=center|6
|align=center|6
|align=center|3
|align=center|22
|align=center|16
|align=center|18
|align=center|fall half
|-
|align=center|1977 		
|  style="text-align:center; background:gold;"|1/(16)	
|align=center|30
|align=center|14
|align=center|15
|align=center|1
|align=center|51
|align=center|12
|align=center|43
|align=center|1/4 finals
|align=center|ECC
|  style="text-align:center; background:#deb678;"|Semi-finals
|align=center|
|-
|align=center|1978
|  style="text-align:center; background:silver;"|2/(16)
|align=center|30
|align=center|15
|align=center|9
|align=center|6
|align=center|42
|align=center|20
|align=center|38
|  style="text-align:center; background:gold;"|Winner
|align=center|UC
|align=center|1/32 finals (first round)
|align=center|Draw games rule
|-
|align=center|1979
|  style="text-align:center; background:#a67d3d;"|3/(18)
|align=center|34
|align=center|21
|align=center|5
|align=center|8
|align=center|51
|align=center|26
|align=center|47
|align=center|1/4 finals
|align=center|ECC
|align=center|1/8 finals (second round)
|align=center|
|-
|align=center|1980
|  style="text-align:center; background:gold;"|1/(18)
|align=center|34
|align=center|21
|align=center|9
|align=center|4
|align=center|63
|align=center|23
|align=center|51
|  style="text-align:center; background:#a67d3d;"|Semi-finals
|align=center|UC
|align=center|1/8 finals (third round)
|align=center|
|-
|align=center|1981
|  style="text-align:center; background:gold;"|1/(18)
|align=center|34
|align=center|22
|align=center|9
|align=center|3
|align=center|58
|align=center|26
|align=center|53
|align=center|1/4 finals
|align=center|UC
|align=center|1/32 finals (first round)
|align=center|
|-
|align=center|1982
|  style="text-align:center; background:silver;"|2/(18)
|align=center|34
|align=center|18
|align=center|10
|align=center|6
|align=center|58
|align=center|25
|align=center|46
|  style="text-align:center; background:gold;"|Winner
|align=center|ECC
|align=center|1/4 finals
|align=center|
|-
|align=center|1983
|align=center|7/(18)
|align=center|34
|align=center|14
|align=center|10
|align=center|10
|align=center|50
|align=center|34
|align=center|38
|align=center|1/4 finals
|align=center|ECC
|align=center|1/4 finals
|align=center|
|-
|align=center|1984
|align=center|10/(18)
|align=center|34
|align=center|12
|align=center|13
|align=center|9
|align=center|46
|align=center|30
|align=center|34
|align=center|1/8 finals
|align=center|UC
|align=center|1/32 finals (first round)
|align=center|Draw games rule
|-
|align=center|1985
|  style="text-align:center; background:gold;"|1/(18)
|align=center|34
|align=center|20
|align=center|8
|align=center|6
|align=center|64
|align=center|26
|align=center|48
|  style="text-align:center; background:gold;"|Winner
|align=center|
|align=center|
|align=center|
|-
|align=center|1986
|  style="text-align:center; background:gold;"|1/(16)
|align=center|30
|align=center|14
|align=center|11
|align=center|5
|align=center|53
|align=center|33
|align=center|39
|align=center|1/8 finals
|align=center|CWC
|  style="text-align:center; background:gold;"|Winner
|  style="text-align:center; background:silver;"|Runner-up of UEFA Super Cup
|-
|align=center|1987
|align=center|6/(16)
|align=center|30
|align=center|11
|align=center|10
|align=center|9
|align=center|37
|align=center|27
|align=center|32
|  style="text-align:center; background:gold;"|Winner
|align=center|ECC
|  style="text-align:center; background:#a67d3d;"|Semi-finals
|align=center|
|-
|align=center|1988
|  style="text-align:center; background:silver;"|2/(16)
|align=center|30
|align=center|17
|align=center|9
|align=center|4
|align=center|43
|align=center|19
|align=center|43
|align=center|1/8 finals
|align=center|ECC
|align=center|1/16 finals (first round)
|align=center|
|-
|align=center|1989
|  style="text-align:center; background:#a67d3d;"|3/(16)
|align=center|30
|align=center|13
|align=center|12
|align=center|5
|align=center|44
|align=center|27
|align=center|38
|  style="text-align:center; background:#a67d3d;"|Semi-finals
|align=center|
|align=center|
|align=center|
|-
|align=center|1990
|  style="text-align:center; background:gold;"|1/(13)
|align=center|24
|align=center|14
|align=center|6
|align=center|4
|align=center|44
|align=center|20
|align=center|34
|  style="text-align:center; background:gold;"|Winner
|align=center|UC
|align=center|1/8 finals (third round)
|align=center|
|-
|align=center|1991
|align=center|5/(16)
|align=center|30
|align=center|13
|align=center|9
|align=center|8
|align=center|43
|align=center|34
|align=center|35
|align=center|1/16 finals
|align=center|CWC
|align=center|1/4 finals
|align=center|
|-
|align=center|1992
| style="text-align:center;" colspan="9"|No championship
|align=center|1/4 finals
|align=center|ECC
|align=center|Group stage
|align=center|Withdrew from Soviet Cup
|}

Ukraine

{|class="wikitable"
|- style="background:#efefef;"
! Season
! Division
! Position
! Pl.
! W
! D
! L
! GS
! GA
! P
!Ukrainian Cup
!Ukrainian Super Cup
!colspan=2|Europe
!Notes
|-
|align=center|1992
| style="text-align:center;" rowspan="17"| 1st(Top League)
|  style="text-align:center; background:silver;"|2
|align=center|18
|align=center|13
|align=center|4
|align=center|1
|align=center|31
|align=center|13
|align=center|30
|align=center|1/4 finals
|align=center|
|align=center colspan=2|
|align=center|
|-
|align=center|1992–93
| rowspan="9" style="text-align:center; background:gold;"|1
|align=center|30
|align=center|18
|align=center|8
|align=center|4
|align=center|59
|align=center|14
|align=center|44
|  style="text-align:center; background:gold;"|Winner
|align=center|
|align=center|UC
|align=center|1/16 finals (second round)
|align=center|
|-
|align=center|1993–94
|align=center|34
|align=center|23
|align=center|10
|align=center|1
|align=center|61
|align=center|21
|align=center|56
|align=center|1/8 finals
|align=center|
|  style="text-align:center; background:lightgreen;"|ECL
| style="text-align:center;background:lightgreen;"|first round
|align=center|
|-
|align=center|1994–95
|align=center|34
|align=center|25
|align=center|8
|align=center|1
|align=center|87
|align=center|24
|align=center|83
|align=center|1/4 finals
|align=center|
|  style="text-align:center; background:lightgreen;"|ECL
| style="text-align:center;background:lightgreen;"|Group stage
|align=center|
|-
|align=center|1995–96
|align=center|34
|align=center|24
|align=center|7
|align=center|3
|align=center|65
|align=center|17
|align=center|79
|  style="text-align:center; background:gold;"|Winner
|align=center|
|  style="text-align:center; background:lightgreen;"|ECL
| style="text-align:center;background:lightgreen;"|Group stage
|align=center|
|-
|align=center|1996–97
|align=center|30
|align=center|23
|align=center|4
|align=center|3
|align=center|69
|align=center|20
|align=center|73
|align=center|1/8 finals
|align=center|
|align=center|UC
|align=center|1/32 finals (first round)
|  style="text-align:center; background:lightgreen;"|ECL – Qual round
|-
|align=center|1997–98
|align=center|30
|align=center|23
|align=center|3
|align=center|4
|align=center|70
|align=center|15
|align=center|72
|  style="text-align:center; background:gold;"|Winner
|align=center|
|  style="text-align:center; background:lightgreen;"|ECL
| style="text-align:center;background:lightgreen;"|Quarter-finals
|align=center|
|-
|align=center|1998–99
|align=center|30
|align=center|23
|align=center|5
|align=center|2
|align=center|75
|align=center|17
|align=center|74
|  style="text-align:center; background:gold;"|Winner
|align=center|
|  style="text-align:center; background:lightgreen;"|ECL
|  style="text-align:center; background:tan;"|Semi-finals
|align=center|
|-
|align=center|1999-00
|align=center|30
|align=center|27
|align=center|3
|align=center|0
|align=center|85
|align=center|18
|align=center|84
|  style="text-align:center; background:gold;"|Winner
|align=center|
|  style="text-align:center; background:lightgreen;"|ECL
| style="text-align:center;background:lightgreen;"|2nd group stage
|align=center|
|-
|align=center|2000–01
|align=center|26
|align=center|20
|align=center|4
|align=center|2
|align=center|58
|align=center|17
|align=center|64
|align=center|1/16 finals
|align=center|
|  style="text-align:center; background:lightgreen;"|ECL
| style="text-align:center;background:lightgreen;"|1st group stage
|align=center|
|-
|align=center|2001–02
|  style="text-align:center; background:silver;"|2
|align=center|26
|align=center|20
|align=center|5
|align=center|1
|align=center|62
|align=center|9
|align=center|65
|  style="text-align:center; background:silver;"|Runner-up
|align=center|
|  style="text-align:center; background:lightgreen;"|ECL
| style="text-align:center;background:lightgreen;"|1st group stage
|align=center|
|-
|align=center|2002–03
| rowspan="2" style="text-align:center; background:gold;"|1
|align=center|30
|align=center|23
|align=center|4
|align=center|3
|align=center|66
|align=center|20
|align=center|73
|  style="text-align:center; background:gold;"|Winner
|align=center|
|align=center|UC
|align=center|3rd round
|  style="text-align:center; background:lightgreen;"|ECL – 1st group stage
|-
|align=center|2003–04
|align=center|30
|align=center|23
|align=center|4
|align=center|3
|align=center|68
|align=center|20
|align=center|73
|  style="text-align:center; background:tan;"|1/2 finals
|align=center|
|  style="text-align:center; background:lightgreen;"|ECL
| style="text-align:center;background:lightgreen;"|1st group stage
|align=center|
|-
|align=center|2004–05
| rowspan="2" style="text-align:center; background:silver;"|2
|align=center|30
|align=center|23
|align=center|4
|align=center|3
|align=center|58
|align=center|14
|align=center|73
|  style="text-align:center; background:gold;"|Winner
|  style="text-align:center; background:gold;"|Winner
|align=center|UC
|align=center|Round of 64
|  style="text-align:center; background:lightgreen;"|ECL – Group stage
|-
|align=center|2005–06
|align=center|30
|align=center|23
|align=center|6
|align=center|1
|align=center|68
|align=center|20
|align=center|75
|  style="text-align:center; background:gold;"|Winner
|align=center bgcolor=silver|Runner-up
|  style="text-align:center; background:lightgreen;"|ECL
| style="text-align:center;background:lightgreen;"|2nd qual round
|align=center|
|-
|align=center|2006–07
|  style="text-align:center; background:gold;"|1
|align=center|30
|align=center|22
|align=center|8
|align=center|0
|align=center|67
|align=center|23
|align=center|74
|  style="text-align:center; background:gold;"|Winner
|  style="text-align:center; background:gold;"|Winner
|  style="text-align:center; background:lightgreen;"|ECL
| style="text-align:center;background:lightgreen;"|Group Stage
|align=center|
|-
|align=center|2007–08
|  style="text-align:center; background:silver;"|2
|align=center|30
|align=center|22
|align=center|5
|align=center|3
|align=center|65
|align=center|26
|align=center|71
|  style="text-align:center; background:silver;"|Runner-up
|  style="text-align:center; background:gold;"|Winner
|  style="text-align:center; background:lightgreen;"|ECL
| style="text-align:center;background:lightgreen;"|Group Stage
|align=center|
|-
|align=center|2008–09
| style="text-align:center;" rowspan="15"| 1st(Premier League)
|  style="text-align:center; background:gold;"|1
|align=center|30
|align=center|26
|align=center|1
|align=center|3
|align=center|71
|align=center|19
|align=center|79
|  style="text-align:center; background:tan;"| 1/2 finals
|align=center bgcolor=silver|Runner-up
|align=center|UC
|  style="text-align:center; background:tan;"|Semi-finals
|  style="text-align:center; background:lightgreen;"|ECL – Group stage
|-
|align=center|2009–10
| rowspan="3" style="text-align:center; background:silver;"|2
|align=center|30
|align=center|22
|align=center|5
|align=center|3
|align=center|61
|align=center|16
|align=center|71
|align=center|1/4 finals
|  style="text-align:center; background:gold;"|Winner
|  style="text-align:center; background:lightgreen;"|ECL
| style="text-align:center;background:lightgreen;"|Group Stage
|align=center|
|-
|align=center|2010–11
|align=center|30
|align=center|20
|align=center|5
|align=center|5
|align=center|60
|align=center|24
|align=center|65
|  style="text-align:center; background:silver;"|Runner-up
|align=center|
|align=center|EL
|align=center|Quarter-finals
|  style="text-align:center; background:lightgreen;"|ECL – PO round
|-
|align=center|2011–12
|align=center|30
|align=center|23
|align=center|6
|align=center|1
|align=center|56
|align=center|12
|align=center|75
|align=center|1/8 finals
|  style="text-align:center; background:gold;"|Winner
|align=center|EL
|align=center|Group Stage
|  style="text-align:center; background:lightgreen;"|ECL – 3rd QR
|-
|align=center|2012–13
|  style="text-align:center; background:tan;"|3
|align=center|30
|align=center|20
|align=center|2
|align=center|8
|align=center|55
|align=center|23
|align=center|62
|align=center|1/16 finals
|align=center|
|align=center|EL
|align=center|Round of 32
|  style="text-align:center; background:lightgreen;"|ECL – Group stage
|-
|align=center|2013–14
|align=center|4
|align=center|28
|align=center|16
|align=center|5
|align=center|7
|align=center|55
|align=center|33
|align=center|53
|  style="text-align:center; background:gold;"| Winner
|align=center|
|align=center|EL
|align=center|Round of 32
|align=center|
|-
| style="text-align:center;"|2014–15
|  rowspan="2" style="text-align:center; background:gold;"|1
|align=center|26
|align=center|20
|align=center|6
|align=center|0
|align=center|65
|align=center|12
|align=center|66
|  style="text-align:center; background:gold;"|Winner
|align=center bgcolor=silver|Runner-up
| style="text-align:center;"|EL
| style="text-align:center;"|Quarter-finals
| style="text-align:center;"|
|-
| style="text-align:center;"|2015–16
|align=center|26
|align=center|23
|align=center|1
|align=center|2
|align=center|54
|align=center|11
|align=center|70
|align=center|1/4 finals
|align=center bgcolor=silver|Runner-up
|  style="text-align:center; background:lightgreen;"|ECL
| style="text-align:center;background:lightgreen;"|Round of 16
| style="text-align:center;"|
|-
|align=center|2016–17
| rowspan="4" style="text-align:center; background:silver;"|2
|align=center|32 	
|align=center|21 	
|align=center|4 	
|align=center|7 	
|align=center|69 	
|align=center|33 	
|align=center|67
|align=center bgcolor=silver|Runner-up
|  style="text-align:center; background:gold;"|Winner
| style="text-align:center; background:lightgreen;"|ECL
| style="text-align:center;background:lightgreen;"|Group Stage
|align=center|
|-
| style="text-align:center;" |2017–18
|align=center|32
|align=center|22
|align=center|7
|align=center|3
|align=center|64
|align=center|25
|align=center|73
|align=center bgcolor=silver|Runner-up
|align=center bgcolor=silver|Runner-up
|align=center|EL
|align=center|Round of 16
|  style="text-align:center; background:lightgreen;"|ECL – 3rd QR
|-
| style="text-align:center;" |2018–19
|align=center|32
|align=center|22
|align=center|6
|align=center|4
|align=center|54
|align=center|18
|align=center|72
|align=center|1/4 finals
|  style="text-align:center; background:gold;"|Winner
|align=center|EL
|align=center|Round of 16
|  style="text-align:center; background:lightgreen;"|ECL – PO round
|-
|2019–20
|align=center|32
|align=center|18
|align=center|5
|align=center|9
|align=center|65
|align=center|35
|align=center|59
|  style="text-align:center; background:gold;"|Winner
|  style="text-align:center; background:gold;"|Winner
|align=center|EL
|align=center|Group Stage
|  style="text-align:center; background:lightgreen;"|ECL – 3rd QR
|-
|2020–21
|  rowspan="1" style="text-align:center; background:gold;"|1
|align=center|26
|align=center|20
|align=center|5
|align=center|1
|align=center|59
|align=center|15
|align=center|65
|  style="text-align:center; background:gold;"|Winner
|  style="text-align:center; background:gold;"|Winner
|align=center|EL
|align=center|Round of 16
|  style="text-align:center; background:lightgreen;"|ECL – Group stage
|-
|2021–22 was terminated 
|align=center|2 (after 18/30)
|align=center|18
|align=center|14
|align=center|3
|align=center|1
|align=center|47
|align=center|9
|align=center|45
|align=center|Not played after Round of 16 
|align=center bgcolor=silver|Runner-up
| style="text-align:center; background:lightgreen;"|ECL
| style="text-align:center;background:lightgreen;"|Group Stage
|   style="text-align:center; background:red;" | began on 24.02.2022 Russian invasion of Ukraine
|-

|2022-23
|align=center|4
|align=center|16
|align=center|9
|align=center|3
|align=center|4
|align=center|24
|align=center|15
|align=center|30
|align=center| Not played
|align=center| Not played
|align=center| EL
|align=center|Group Stage
|  style="text-align:center; background:lightgreen;"|ECL – PO round
|-
|}

See also
 The Invincibles (football)

References

Seasons
 
Dynamo Kyiv